Westbourne is a village, civil parish and electoral ward in the Chichester District of West Sussex, England. The parish includes the hamlets of Woodmancote and Aldsworth, and once included the settlements of Southbourne and Prinsted to the south.

Geography
The village stands on the River Ems, a small river flowing into Chichester Harbour at Emsworth. It is believed that the village takes its name from its position on the river, which traditionally marks the westernmost boundary of Sussex, The River Ems was originally known as the  Bourne, but was renamed by the 16th century chronicler Raphael Holinshed.

The population of the village in 2011 is 2,309, 1,656 of whom are economically active, and who live in 1,000 households.

History
Westbourne contains 66 listed buildings some dating back to the 16th Century, though written evidence of habitation can be found in the Domesday Book of 1086. The medieval Church of St John the Baptist is notable for its fine yew avenue, which is apparently the oldest in England, and walled graveyard. Nicholas Levett, a native of Petworth and fellow of Balliol College, Oxford, was longtime minister of St John the Baptist. He was buried in Beckley, Oxfordshire, in 1687.

Today
Commonside forms the northern edge of the village of Westbourne. This area is centred on a village pub called the Cricketers which is located near the village cricket pitch. There are two other public houses, the White Horse and the Stag's Head, both in The Square, at the centre of the oldest part of the village.  Until 2010, a third pub called the Good Intent was open in North Street, but this has now closed and has been converted to a private home.

As of April 2011, the north-eastern and eastern edges of the village now form boundaries with the newly designated South Downs National Park.

Governance
Westbourne is part of the Chichester constituency, a safe Conservative seat since 1924.  The District Councillor is Roy Briscoe and the County Councillor is Andrew Kerry-Bedell.

Notable residents
On 16 May 1785 James Biden married Anne Silverlock at Westbourne, both parishioners, and the  great-great-great-great-grandparents of 46th US President Joe Biden.
George Sparkes (1845-1908), cricketer
Tim Peake (1972–present), test pilot and astronaut (though not currently living in Westbourne)

References

Further reading
Roch, Lucinda and Toms, Matthew (2005) The Westbourne Story, Emsworth: Kenneth Mason Publications, p. 192,

External links
 
Further historical information and sources on GENUKI

Villages in West Sussex
Chichester District